Stephen Pyle (born 28 September 1963) is an English retired professional footballer who played as a midfielder and forward in the Football League for Cambridge United and Torquay United. He later had a long career as a player and manager in non-League football.

References 

Living people
1963 births
Sportspeople from North Shields
Footballers from Tyne and Wear
English Football League players
Cambridge United F.C. players
Torquay United F.C. players
Blyth Spartans A.F.C. players
North Shields F.C. players
Gateshead F.C. players
Whitby Town F.C. players
Whitley Bay F.C. players
North Shields F.C. managers
Northern Football League players
Northern Premier League players
National League (English football) players
Association football midfielders
Association football forwards
English football managers
English footballers